Tanzer Industries Limited was a Canadian boat manufacturer based in Dorion, Quebec. The company specialized in the design and manufacture of fibreglass sailboats.

History
The company was founded by Johann Tanzer in 1966 and went bankrupt in May 1986. Johann Tanzer designed many of the boats his company sold.

During the period the company was in business it became one of the largest sailboat manufacturers in Canada. The most produced boat was the Tanzer 22 with 2,271 built. The company built over 8,000 boats of all types.

Aside from the main manufacturing facility in Dorion, Quebec, the company also had operations on the US east and west coasts at Edenton, North Carolina and in Arlington, Washington.

Sailboats 

Summary of sailboats built by Tanzer Industries:

Constellation 16
Flying Scot
M-16 Scow
Nutmeg 24
Overnighter 16
Tanzer 7.5
Tanzer 8.5
Tanzer 10
Tanzer 10.5
Tanzer 14
Tanzer 16
Tanzer 22
Tanzer 25
Tanzer 26
Tanzer 27
Tanzer 28
Tanzer 29
Tanzer 31

See also
List of sailboat designers and manufacturers

References

External links

Tanzer Industries